Athletes from the Socialist Federal Republic of Yugoslavia competed at the 1972 Summer Olympics in Munich, West Germany. 126 competitors, 113 men and 13 women, took part in 73 events in 15 sports.

Medalists

Athletics

Men's 800 metres
Jože Medjumurec
 Heat – 1:48.1
 Semifinals – 1:49.0 (→ did not advance)

Men's 1500 metres
Jože Medjumurec
 Heat – 3:52.1 (→ did not advance)

Men's 5000 metres
Daniel Korica
 Heat – DNS (→ did not advance)

Basketball

Men's team competition
Preliminary Round
 Defeated Italy (85-78)
 Defeated Poland (85-64)
 Lost to Puerto Rico (74-79)
 Defeated Philippines (117-76)
 Defeated West Germany (81-56)
 Defeated Senegal (73-57)
 Lost to Soviet Union (67-74)
Classification Matches
 5th/8th place: Defeated Czechoslovakia (66-63)
 5th/6th place: Defeated Puerto Rico (86-70) → Fifth place

Team roster

Boxing 

Men's Light Middleweight (– 71 kg)
Svetomir Belić
 First Round – Defeated Dumar Fall (SEN), 4:1
 Second Round – Lost to Anthony Richardson (HOL), 2:3

Canoeing

Cycling

Five cyclists represented Yugoslavia in 1972.

Individual road race
 Radoš Čubrić – 43rd place
 Jože Valenčič – 51st place
 Eugen Pleško – did not finish (→ no ranking)
 Janez Zakotnik – did not finish (→ no ranking)

 Team time trial
 Cvitko Bilić
 Radoš Čubrić
 Jože Valenčič
 Janez Zakotnik

Gymnastics

Handball

Yugoslavia won the second Olympic handball tournament. In the first round, they defeated all three opponents (Japan, the United States, and Hungary to take first place in the group and join seven other teams in advancing to the second round. There, they defeated both of the other teams they played (West Germany and Romania). First place in the division earned Yugoslavia the chance to appear in the gold medal game, where they defeated Czechoslovakia.

Men's Team Competition:
 Yugoslavia - Gold medal (6-0)

Judo

Rowing

Sailing

Finn
 Fabris Minski – 146.0 (→ 21st place)

Flying Dutchman
 Anton Grego and Simo Nikolic – 63.7 (→ 5th place)

Alternate member:: Zoricic, Filip

Shooting

Two male shooters represented Yugoslavia in 1972.
Open

Swimming

Men's 100m Freestyle
Sandro Rudan
 Heat – 56.91s (→  did not advance)

Men's 200m Freestyle
Sandro Rudan
 Heat – 2:05.88 (→  did not advance)

Water polo

Men's team competition

Preliminary round

Pool A

Group I  (Classification Gold – 6th)

Team Roster
 Dušan Antunović
 Siniša Belamarić
 Ozren Bonačić
 Zoran Janković
 Ronald Lopatny
 Miloš Marković
 Uroš Marović
 Đorđe Perišić
 Ratko Rudić
 Mirko Sandić
 Karlo Stipanić

Weightlifting

Wrestling

References

External links
Official Olympic Reports
International Olympic Committee results database

Nations at the 1972 Summer Olympics
1972
Summer Olympics